STP Airways is the national airline of São Tomé, São Tomé and Príncipe. It is currently on the list of carriers banned from operating into the European Union, so its flights are operated by the Portuguese airline EuroAtlantic Airways.

History
STP Airways commenced operations on 18 August 2008 with flights between Lisbon, Portugal, and São Tomé, São Tomé and Príncipe, with a Boeing 767 aircraft leased from parent company, EuroAtlantic Airways. From 24 October 2012 STP Airways is using EuroAtlantic Airways B737-800 on weekly Lisbon service.

Destinations

Fleet

As of August 2019, the STP Airways fleet uses the following aircraft:

The airline also operates Dornier 228s on flights to Príncipe. In the past, STP Airways used to operate two Boeing 767-300ER from its parent company, EuroAtlantic Airways (CS-TFS and CS-TFT). Both planes returned to EuroAtlantic by 2013. Since then, STP Airways started to operate a Boeing 737-800 also from EuroAtlantic. However, in May 2015, the company resumed to operate one Boeing 767.

References

External links
STP Airways
STP Airways Fleet

Airlines banned in the European Union
Airlines of São Tomé and Príncipe
Airlines established in 2008
2008 establishments in São Tomé and Príncipe
São Tomé
Companies of São Tomé and Príncipe